Thomas Henry Wolfe (7 March 1900 – 1954) was a Welsh amateur football inside left who played in the Football League for Fulham, Southend United, Coventry City, Charlton Athletic and Bristol Rovers. He was capped by Wales at amateur level.

Career statistics

References 

Welsh footballers
English Football League players
Wales amateur international footballers
Association football inside forwards
1900 births
Sportspeople from Barry, Vale of Glamorgan
1954 deaths
Place of death missing
Barry Town United F.C. players
Coventry City F.C. players
Southend United F.C. players
Fulham F.C. players
Charlton Athletic F.C. players
Bristol Rovers F.C. players
Association football wing halves